The Head of the River Race (HORR) is an against-the-clock ('processional') rowing race held annually on the River Thames in London, England between eights, other such races being the Schools' Head of the River Race, Women's Head of the River Race and Veterans' Head of the River Race.  Its competitors are, with a few experienced junior exceptions, seniors of UK or overseas competitors and it runs with the ebb tide down the 4.25 mile (6.8 km) Championship Course from Mortlake to Putney which hosts the Oxford and Cambridge head-to-head races usually between one and two weeks later.

The race was founded on a much smaller scale, in 1925, by Steve Fairbairn – an influential rower then rowing coach of the early 20th century, who transformed the sport into one involving today's lengthier slides enabling conventional (Fairbairnized) racing shell propulsion.

History
The race was founded by the rowing coach Steve Fairbairn who was a great believer in the importance of distance training over the winter. "Mileage makes champions" was one of Fairbairn's repeated phrases included in his four volumes on rowing coaching and in other correspondence. He devised the race while coaching at Thames Rowing Club to encourage this form of training and raise the standard of winter training among London clubs.  He transformed the sport by introducing a full body and leg-drive catch and introducing sliding seats.

A race proposal meeting followed between the captains of the metropolitan (i.e. London) clubs, who received the idea with great enthusiasm, and it was agreed that the first race would be held on Sunday 12 December 1926. Despite the choice of day of the week, the race went ahead with 23 entries (21 started) at a cost of 5s per crew.

"So far the ARA were slumbering in sweet ignorance of the horrible fact that racing was taking place on a Sunday. So the Committee bravely fixed Sunday, 27th March as the date for the second race, but the publicity the event had received had drawn the attention of the ARA and at a meeting of the committee on February 19th a letter was read from the ruling body pointing out that it might be necessary to alter the date of the race as the ARA might pass a resolution banning racing on Sundays... The Head of the River Committee agreed to abandon the December race and row one annual race in March or thereabouts on Saturday afternoons."

With the future of the race agreed, the number of entrants steadily rose:

 1927 — 41 entries, all tideway crews (except two from Jesus College, Cambridge);
 1928 — 49 crews;
 1929 — 60 crews;
 1930 — 77 crews; 
 1936 — 127 crews;
 ... up to 1939 — 154 crews.

There was no race in 1937 (there was no suitable tide on a Saturday and at that time organised competitive sport did not take place on Sundays) nor from 1940 to 1945 inclusive due to the second world war. The event was restarted in 1946 (naturally starting with a smaller number of entrants – 71 crews) and has taken place annually ever since, with the exceptions of 2004, 2007, 2013, and 2017 when the race was cancelled due to bad weather, and 2020 and 2021 due to the COVID-19 pandemic.

As of 2014, London RC have won the race most often, 14 times (all before 1979) followed by Leander Club (in Henley) 13 times.  An overtly GB National Squad, usually its eight, have won the race 12 times.  The GB National Squad men's eight tends to compete the race and may enter under a temporary club of their choice or what is in any event the main non-international season rowing club where they train that year.  Given these past combinations, crews that are partly the GB men's eight have won the race more than 40 times.  Overseas entries have claimed the top prize 4 times.  The other categories pitch themselves at the top clubs around the UK and the overseas pennant is the main prize nationally only available to overseas winners of any rowing competition.

From 1979 onwards, due to the sheer volume of competitors and for reasons of safety on a relatively small area of river and riverside, the HORR Committee had at that point to impose a limit of 420 crews, which still exists today.  Entries are typically required and accepted in January for overseas crews and in February for UK crews.

Race format

The race is only open to men's eights and is considered to be the peak of the head race season — attracting the top UK crews as well as foreign clubs.  Composite crews, drawn from more than one club or institution, are not permitted.

The Championship Course is that of the Oxford and Cambridge Boat Race but, unlike the Boat Race, the Head of the River Race is raced on an ebb tide from Mortlake to Putney. The starting time for the race is different every year and depends on the tide — the first crew (winner from the previous year) starts the race the next year. Start time is usually about 2 hours after high tide and crews start at about 10 second intervals.

The record time of 16 min 37 s was set in 1987 by the Great Britain National Squad.

The Race is usually held on the third or fourth Saturday in March each year, depending on tides and the date of the Boat Race. Usually the two events are held on separate days, although in 1987 and 1994, the Boat Race took place in the morning and the Head in the afternoon

Raced over the same course in eights are the Schools' Head of the River Race (SHORR) organised by Westminster School, the Women's Eights Head of the River Race (WEHoRR) and Veterans' Head of the River Race organised by Vesta Rowing Club.  In other boats on the same course are raced the Head of the River Fours (HOR4s) sponsored by Fuller's Brewery, the Veterans' Fours Head of the River and the Scullers Head organised by Vesta RC. The Pairs' Head is run over a shorter course from Chiswick Bridge to Hammersmith Bridge. The Veterans' HOR and Pairs HOR sometimes race in the reverse direction if tides do not permit the usual arrangement.

The race has since at least 1990 seen an excess of crews wishing to enter so a few minimum race wins are imposed therefore sometimes for each category, and always for elite and senior categories.

Trophies

Medals are awarded to all 14 categories. Eight trophies are awarded for the fastest crews under these categories:

Head of the River — bust of Steve Fairbairn, a Head pennant plaque are awarded to the club whose crew returns the fastest time.
UK-only trophies:
Vernon Trophy — Karl Vernon presented the first of the three location-based club trophies in 1954 and this is made from the melted-down silver of trophies he won in his own racing career.  The trophy is a statuette of the oarsman Jack Beresford (five-time Olympic medallist). Awarded to the fastest club crew normally rowing on the Thames Tideway.
Page Trophy — Presented by the Head of the River Committee in memory of J.H. Page and awarded to the fastest club crew normally rowing on the Thames or its tributaries but not on the Tideway.
Jackson Trophy — instituted by members of Nottingham Britannia RC in 1950, originally as the prize for an annual "County Eights" event between Nottinghamshire and Derbyshire. In 1960 it was presented to The Head of the River Race as the trophy for UK clubs outside of the Thames basin; it was by then in the form of a mounted blade. The 2002 Race saw it won by Nottingham Britannia, who given its many years winners' names arranged with the race organisers a replacement trophy.
Services Pennant — crews from Her Majesty's Armed Forces
Churcher Trophy — university crews of any standard
Halladay Trophy — university crews at or below Intermediate 2 status
Overseas Entrants Trophy — crews from overseas

Eight pennants (large triangular flags), a plaque and individual medals are awarded annually since 2015 to the fastest: 
Senior, IM1, IM2, IM3A (academic), IM3C (club), NoviceA (academic), NoviceC (club) (all UK).
Lightweight crew (<73.5 kg for each rower) (Overseas or UK).

Head wins to date
Extract from full results on the race organisation's website:
 2022 - Oxford Brookes University  
 2021 – Race cancelled due to COVID-19 pandemic
 2020 – Race cancelled due to COVID-19 pandemic
 2019 – Oxford Brookes University  
 2018 – Oxford Brookes University  + Leander Club  (dead heat)
 2017 - Race cancelled
 2016 - Oxford Brookes University 
 2015 – Leander Club 
 2014 – Race abandoned 
 2013 – Race cancelled
 2012 – Czech Rowing Federation 

 2011 – Leander Club 
 2010 – Molesey BC 
 2009 – Tideway Scullers School 
 2008 – Leander Club 
 2007 – Race abandoned 
 2006 – Leander Club 
 2005 – Leander Club 
 2004 – Race cancelled
 2003 – Leander Club  
 2002 – Leander Club 
 2001 – Queen's Tower (Before 2006 only admitted Imperial College Alumni) 
 2000 – Queen's Tower 
 1999 – Queen's Tower 
 1998 – Leander Club 
 1997 – Leander Club 
 1996 – Leander Club 
 1995 – Netherlands Rowing Federation 
 1994 – RV Münster von 1882 
 1993 – RV Münster von 1882 
 1992 – Molesey BC 
 1991 – Leander Club 
 1990 – Great Britain National Squad 
 1989 – Great Britain National Squad 
 1988 – Great Britain National Squad 
 1987 – Great Britain National Squad 
 1986 – Great Britain National Squad 
 1985 – Great Britain National Squad 
 1984 – Great Britain National Squad 
 1983 – Thames Tradesmen's Rowing Club 
 1982 – Great Britain National Squad 
 1981 – Thames Tradesmen's Rowing Club 
 1980 – Great Britain National Squad II 
 1979 – Great Britain National Squad 
 1978 – London RC 
 1977 – Leander Club 
 1976 – Great Britain National Squad 
 1975 – Great Britain National Squad 
 1974 – Tideway Scullers 
 1973 – Leander Club 
 1972 – Tideway Scullers II 
 1971 – Tideway Scullers 
 1970 – Tideway Scullers 
 1969 – Tideway Scullers II 
 1968 – Tideway Scullers 
 1967 – Tideway Scullers 
 1966 – Tideway Scullers 
 1965 – Tideway Scullers 
 1964 – Tideway Scullers 
 1963 – University of London BC 
 1962 – Barn Cottage
 1961 – Barn Cottage
 1960 – Barn Cottage
 1959 – Barn Cottage
 1958 – Barn Cottage
 1957 – Isis (OUBC) 
 1956 – Thames RC III 
 1955 – Thames RC 
 1954 – Royal Air Force 
 1953 – Thames Rowing Club 
 1952 – Jesus College Cambridge 
 1951 – Jesus College Cambridge 
 1950 – London RC 
 1949 – London RC 
 1948 – Thames RC 
 1947 – Jesus College Cambridge 
 1946 – Imperial College London 
 1940-1945 – No entries permitted. World War II
 1939 – London RC 
 1938 – Goldie (CUBC) 
 1937 – Race cancelled
 1936 – Thames RC 
 1935 – London RC 
 1934 – London RC 
 1933 – London RC 
 1932 – London RC 
 1931 – London RC 
 1930 – London RC 
 1929 – London RC 
 1928 – London RC 
 1927 – London RC and Thames RC (equal times)  
 1926 – London RC

See also
Rowing on the River Thames including
Head of the River Fours
Women's Eights Head of the River Race
Scullers Head of the River Race (single sculls)
Head of the Charles Regatta (USA)
Head of the Hooch (USA)
Head of the River (Australia)
Schools' Head of the River Race

Notes and references
Notes 

References

Bibliography
Cleaver, Hylton, A History of Rowing.
Page, Geoffrey, Hear the Boat Sing — A History of Thames Rowing Club and tideway rowing.

External links
Head of the River Race official website

Mortlake, London
Putney
Rowing on the River Thames
Recurring sporting events established in 1926
Water sports in London
Head races